Reza Abbaschian is an Iranian/American engineer, currently the William R. Johnson, Jr. Family Professor, Distinguished Professor of Mechanical Engineering and the former Dean of the Bourns College of Engineering and, also formerly the Vladimir Grodsky Professor of Materials Science at University of Florida. In 2006, he was elected to the American Association for the Advancement of Science, The Minerals, Metals and Materials Society and ASM, the latter of which he was a former president.

Abbaschian is considered pivotal in establishing a relationship with Winston Chung, which led to a $10 million donation to the college.

Abbascian was recognized with the 2017 AIME Honorary Membership Award for "pioneering contributions in solidification processing, materials education and leadership in materials science and engineering worldwide".

Education
Ph.D. in Materials Science and Engineering from the University of California, Berkeley
M.S. in metallurgical engineering from Michigan Technological University
BSc in mining and metallurgy from Tehran University

References

Year of birth missing (living people)
Living people
Fellows of the American Association for the Advancement of Science
University of California, Riverside faculty
University of Florida faculty
American mechanical engineers
UC Berkeley College of Engineering alumni
Michigan Technological University alumni
University of Tehran alumni
Engineers from California
Fellows of the Minerals, Metals & Materials Society